Uorullubut kus is a forest in the western and central part of Megino-Kangalassky Ulus. It covers an area of 21 km2 and is approximately 3 km from Allaraa Besteeh and 5 km from Tyokhtyur. Previously 71% of the forest was pine, but in 2008 a fire caused by man destroyed 61% of the forest area. Since 1989 it has been open to the public. Kyys Timirbit lake lies in the forest, as do numerous rivers.

Forests of Russia
Geography of the Sakha Republic